Marleen Wissink is a former Dutch football goalkeeper. She played at 1.FFC Frankfurt for more than a decade, winning two UEFA Women's Cups and five Bundesligas. 

She was a member of the Dutch national team. With 141 international games she was the most capped Dutch player one time but has since been overtaken.

Honours
Club
Frankfurt
 Bundesliga (5): 1999, 2001, 2002, 2003, 2005
 DFB-Pokal (5): 1999, 2000, 2001, 2002, 2003
 UEFA Women's Cup (2): 2002, 2006

References

1969 births
Living people
Dutch women's footballers
Dutch expatriate sportspeople in Germany
Netherlands women's international footballers
Expatriate women's footballers in Germany
1. FFC Frankfurt players
FIFA Century Club
Footballers from Enschede
Women's association football goalkeepers
Dutch expatriate women's footballers
Puck Deventer players